This is a list of Japanese boxing world champions who have won major world titles from the "Big four" governing bodies in professional boxing namely the World Boxing Association (WBA), World Boxing Council (WBC), International Boxing Federation (IBF) and World Boxing Organization (WBO).
It was in 1952 that Yoshio Shirai won the world flyweight crown, becoming the first Japanese world champion. Japan ranks third worldwide between countries with most boxing world champions.

The most thriving period of Japan's boxing ran from the 1960s to the early 1970s. In the "golden 60s," Fighting Harada won championships in two divisions—flyweight and bantamweight. In the 1970s, Japan had 5 world champions for a short period at the same time. Notable achievements in that period were Kuniaki Shibata's attainment of 3 world championships in two divisions, Guts Ishimatsu captured the WBC lightweight championship becoming the first Japanese champion in the lightweight division. Koichi Wajima, one of the most popular boxers in Japan for his peculiar "Frog Jump" uppercut punch, also left a big footstep in Japan's boxing history by winning junior middleweight championship 3 times including 6 consecutive title defenses.

List of men's professional boxing world champions

The following is a list of Japanese boxing champions who have held titles from one or more of the "Big Four" organizations (WBA, WBC, IBF, WBO) and The Ring.

WBA has four recognized world champions, Super, Undisputed, Unified, and Regular. The highest tier title is considered the primary champion of the division. Only boxers who are in the primary champion lineage are listed.

The ranking of WBA's primary champions are as follows:Super/UndisputedUnifiedRegular''

Other former international/national-world boxing commissions and organizations from the beginning of boxing are also included here:
 New York State Athletic Commission  (NYSAC)
 National Boxing Association (NBA) - changed its name to World Boxing Association (WBA) in 1962

Note 
Interim titles are not included unless they get promoted to the official champion.
For WBA champions, only champions in the WBA primary lineage are listed.

List of WBA secondary champions

List of women's professional boxing world champions

The following is a list of female Japanese boxing champions who have held titles from one or more of the "Big Four" organizations (WBA, WBC, IBF, WBO) and The Ring.

Current titleholders in world boxing sanctioning bodies

Major (WBA, WBC, IBF, WBO)

Men's World Champions

Women's World Champions

See also

List of WBA world champions
List of WBC world champions
List of IBF world champions
List of WBO world champions
List of IBO world champions
List of The Ring world champions
List of undisputed boxing champions
Boxing in Japan

References

External links
Japanese Boxing

boxing champions, List of Japanese
Japanese world boxing champions, List of

Japanese
Boxing in Japan